is a railway station in Kurashiki, Okayama Prefecture, Japan.

Lines
West Japan Railway Company
Sanyō Main Line

See also
 List of railway stations in Japan

Railway stations in Okayama Prefecture
Sanyō Main Line
Railway stations in Japan opened in 1930
Kurashiki